The 1997 Bank of the West Classic was a women's tennis tournament played on outdoor hard courts at the Taube Tennis Center in Stanford, California in the United States that was part of Tier II of the 1997 WTA Tour. It was the 26th edition of the tournament and was held from July 21 through July 27, 1997. First-seeded Martina Hingis won the singles title.

Finals

Singles

 Martina Hingis defeated  Conchita Martínez 6–0, 6–2
 It was Hingis' 11th title of the year and the 17th of her career.

Doubles

 Lindsay Davenport /  Martina Hingis defeated  Conchita Martínez /  Patricia Tarabini 6–1, 6–3
 It was Davenport's 8th title of the year and the 26th of her career. It was Hingis' 12th title of the year and the 18th of her career.

References

External links
 ITF tournament edition details
 Tournament draws

Bank of the West Classic
Silicon Valley Classic
Bank of the West Classic
Bank of the West Classic
Bank of the West Classic